Quantula is a genus air-breathing, tropical land snails. It is a terrestrial, pulmonate, gastropod mollusc in the family Dyakiidae.

Species
The World Register of Marine Species lists:
Quantula franzhuberi Thach, 2020
Quantula godwinausteni (Laidlaw, 1931)
Quantula naggsi Thach & F. Huber, 2020
Quantula simonei Thach & F. Huber, 2018
Quantula striata (Gray, 1834)
Quantula tenera (Möllendorff, 1901)
Quantula weinkauffiana (Crosse & P. Fischer, 1863)

References

 Bank, R. A. (2017). Classification of the Recent terrestrial Gastropoda of the World. Last update: July 16th, 2017

External links
 Baker, H. B. (1941). Zonitid snails from Pacific islands. Part 3 and 4. Bernice P. Bishop Museum Bulletin. 166: 203–370.

Gastropod genera
Dyakiidae